Elaine Carhartt (born 1951) is an American ceramist.

Carhartt is a native of Grand Junction, Colorado, who has spent much of her career in Pasadena, California. She graduated from Colorado State University with a bachelor of fine arts degree in 1975, and moved to California the next year. She has won numerous honors and awards, including, in 1980, that for new talent offered by the Los Angeles County Museum of Art. Stylistically, Carhartt's work is influenced by the traditional ceramics of Turkey and Portugal. Besides freestanding sculptures she produces tile murals and prints.

References

American ceramists
1951 births
Living people
American women ceramists
Colorado State University alumni
People from Grand Junction, Colorado
Artists from Colorado
Artists from Pasadena, California
20th-century ceramists
21st-century ceramists
20th-century American artists
20th-century American women artists
21st-century American women artists